Charles Livingston Stover (July 9, 1866 – May 5, 1927) was an American football player and coach. He served as a player-coach at Tufts University in 1890, compiling a record of 2–3. He graduated from Tufts in 1891.

Head coaching record

References

External links
 

1866 births
1927 deaths
19th-century players of American football
Player-coaches
Tufts Jumbos football coaches
Tufts Jumbos football players
Sportspeople from Brooklyn
Players of American football from New York City
People from Lowell, Massachusetts